Zhang Tianran (8 August 1889 – 29 September 1947) was the eighteenth patriarch as well as the founder of the I-Kuan Tao (Yiguandao) religious sect. He is usually referred to as the Father of I-Kuan Tao, or as Shi Zun, meaning the Honored Teacher.

Early life
He was born under the name Kui Sheng, and also as Zhang Guang Bi. Zhang Tian Ran was his official religious name. He was also known as Kung Chang (Kung and Chang are the two readings of the character Zhang). Zhang was born on the 19th day of the 7th Lunar month in 1889, in Jining prefecture, northern province Shandong.

He left home and traveled to Nanjing and Shanghai. At age 24, Zhang joined the army as a low ranking military officer.  Zhang was then initiated in I-Kuan Tao in 1914. The 17th patriarch Lu Zhongyi heard the conduct of Zhang and told Zhang to join in Jining. Lu died in 1925, and was succeeded by his sister, Lu Zhongjie who temporarily looked after I Kuan Tao for six years. In 1930, Venerable Zhang and Sun Su Zhen became the 18th patriarch.

Leadership in I-Kuan Tao
There are various accounts concerning the transfer of the 18th patriarch and the meeting of Zhang Tianran with Sun Suzhen. The most simple account states that the Venerable Mother transferred the 18th patriarchs to both Zhang and Sun. The most widely accepted version in Western literature states that Zhang took Sun Suzhen as his second wife in 1930. She was already a member of I-Kuan Tao and it was believed that Zhang married her after a "divine message". The Eastern account, however, states that he married her in name only, since it was inappropriate at the time for an unmarried woman and a man to be seen traveling around alone together, which they often did to carry forth their mission. Hence, their "marriage" was to quell rumours and societal taboos. In truth, they were never married. Zhang was considered as the incarnation of Ji Gong, a Buddhist monk who was revered as an incarnation of an Arhat by Buddhists and also Taoists. Sun was then considered as the reincarnation of Yue Hui (Bodhisattva of Moon Wisdom). Yet, it is noted that Zhang and Sun were husband and wife in name without intimate relationship. Sun was only responsible for leading and propagating Tao. He didn't have much time for his kids but he had exactly 12. He would make time to spend with them.

Zhang moved out of Jining, and in 1931 traveled to Jinan the capital of Shandong, to spread his teachings. He founded the Hall of Lofty Splendor (Chong Hua Tang) and attracted many followers. These first followers later become Zhang's apostles. From Jinan I-Kuan Tao spread quickly throughout North China. Within a year, four more temples were established. In 1934, Zhang went to Tianjin, established another temple and became the base of the propagation. In 1937, Tianjin had more than 100 temples. From Tianjin, Zhang's disciples propagated his teachings to various parts of China.

Under the Japanese occupation, I-Kuan Tao survived and spread rapidly, centered in Central China. The cult with apocalyptic beliefs and strong mystical elements attracted many. The politically chaotic situation during this period helped I-Kuan Tao grow more rapidly. The apocalyptic teaching promised that by following I-Kuan Tao, one would be spared from calamity. By 1940, I-Kuan Tao reached the southern province of Jiangxi. I-Kuan Tao also attracted a number of officials of the Japanese puppet government of Wang Jingwei. During 1950, it was estimated there were about 178,000 followers in Beijing and 140,000 followers in Tianjin.

Death
After the war ended, Zhang was sick. He died on the 15th day of the 8th Lunar Month, the Mid Autumn Festival, on 29 September 1947, in the city of Chengdu in Sichuan province. He was buried in Hangzhou.

See also
 I-Kuan Tao
 Lu Zhongyi
 Sun Suzhen

References

David Jordan & Daniel Overmyer. 1985. The Flying Phoenix: Aspects of Chinese Sectarianism in Taiwan. Princeton University Press. 
Soo Khin Wah. 1997. A Study of the Yiguan Dao (Unity Sect) and its Development in Peninsular Malaysia. PhD dissertation, University of British Columbia.
Jo Swinnen. 2003. Yiguan Dao: Aspecten van een Moderne Chinese Religie. Katholieke Universiteit Leuven.

External links
Patriarchs of I Kuan Tao
History of Zhang Tian Ran according to I Kuan Tao
Founder of I Kuan Tao

1889 births
1947 deaths
I-Kuan Tao Patriarchs
Founders of new religious movements
People from Jining
Yiguandao